Kafoshan (also Romanized as Kāfoshān; also known as Gāh Fashān, Gāh Foshān, Kāh Fashān, and Kāpāsān) is a village in Zazeran Rural District, in the Central District of Falavarjan County, Isfahan Province, Iran. At the 2006 census, its population was 1,655, in 443 families.

References 

Populated places in Falavarjan County